Murat İlhan (born 25 October 1984), better known by his stage name Massaka, is a Turkish rapper and songwriter. He is also known by his song "3 Kings" with Snoop Dogg.

Discography 
 Blutbeton (with Monstar361) (2007)
 Dämmerung (with Monstar361) (2010)
 Das Ritual (2011)
 Blutbeton 2 (with Monstar361) (2012)
 Istila (with Kodes) (2016)
 Siyah (2018)
 Flashback (2018)
 Syndikat (with Monstar361) (2019)

References 

Living people
1984 births
People from Friedrichshain-Kreuzberg
German rappers
Turkish rappers
Turkish hip hop
Turkish lyricists
Turkish male singers
21st-century German male singers
German people of Turkish descent